This is a list of United States ambassadors to the Gambia, the first of who was appointed on May 18, 1965, exactly three months after it attained independence from the United Kingdom.

Ambassadors

Notes

See also
The Gambia–United States relations
Foreign relations of the Gambia
Ambassadors of the United States

Notes

References
United States Department of State: Background notes on the Gambia

External links
 United States Department of State: Chiefs of Mission for The Gambia
 United States Department of State: The Gambia
 United States Embassy in Banjul

Gambia, The
 
United States